"San Francisco Bay" is a song by the British rock band Smokie from their 1979 studio album The Other Side of the Road. It was the album's third and final single.

Background and writing 
The song was written by Chris Norman and Smokie drummer Pete Spencer and produced by Mike Chapman.

Commercial performance 
The song reached no. 9 in Germany.

Charts

References

External links 

 Smokie – "San Francisco Bay / You're You" (1979) at Discogs

1979 songs
1979 singles
Smokie (band) songs
Songs written by Chris Norman
RAK Records singles
Song recordings produced by Mike Chapman